The Women's team sabre  event of the 2012 World Fencing Championships took place in Kyiv.

Medalists

Draw

Finals

Top half

Bottom half

Placement matches

5–8th place

9–12th place

13–16th place

Final classification

External links
 Official results
 Bracket

2012 World Fencing Championships
World